Conflicto is a Mexican telenovela produced by Televisa and transmitted by Telesistema Mexicano.

Cast 
Carmen Molina
Alejandro Ciangherotti
Nicolás Rodríguez
Freddy Fernández "El Pichi"
Jacqueline Andere

References 

Mexican telenovelas
1961 telenovelas
Televisa telenovelas
1961 Mexican television series debuts
1961 Mexican television series endings
Spanish-language telenovelas